John Willison is also the name of:

John Willison (1680–1750), Scottish Christian minister and author
Sir John Stephen Willison (1856–1927), Canadian journalist

See also
John Willison Green (1927–2016), Canadian journalist